Pilato is a surname of Italian origin. Notable people with the surname include:

 Herbie J Pilato (born 1960), American writer
 Joseph Pilato (1949–2019), American actor
 Kemmy Pilato (born 1989), Botswanan footballer

See also
 Pilato (disambiguation)

Surnames of Italian origin